Margaret Agnes Keay  (11 June 1911 - 26 October 1998), was a South African-born British phytopathologist. She played a role in the development of educational institutions in Africa through activism and financial programmes focusing on education of girls and women in Africa.

Life and career

South Africa
Keay was born on 11 June 1911 in Pretoria, South Africa, the only child of Scottish parents.  Her father was Under-Secretary for Justice in the Union of South Africa. Her early schooling was at the Collegiate School for Girls in Port Elizabeth. She completed a BSc in Botany and a Secondary teachers certificate (with distinction) at Cape Town University.

England
In 1934 she became a research student in mycology and plant pathology at Newnham College, Cambridge under F.T. Brooks and in 1943 she was appointed a lecturer at the University of Reading, England. She also spent some time in Norfolk, England researching diseases in flax, which was used in parachute harnesses. She returned to Cambridge to the Cambridge University School of Agriculture after the Second World War where she worked with the Commonwealth Potato Collection (now held at the James Hutton Institute and Svalbard Global Seed Vault).

At this time women were only allowed to attend either Girton College or Newnham College at Cambridge. Keay joined a lobby group to have more of the colleges open to women. New Hall and Lucy Cavendish, both female only colleges, were subsequently opened.

Uganda
In 1954, she went to Uganda, and was appointed as reader in agricultural botany at the Faculty of Agriculture of Makerere College (now Makere University) in Kampala and became head of department in 1960. She was appointed dean of the faculty of agriculture in 1962. During her time in Uganda she assisted in establishing a bursary fund for the secondary education of girls in Uganda. She was also a member of the Uganda Foundation for the Blind.

Nigeria
In 1964, she moved to Nigeria where she was appointed senior plant pathologist of the Institute for Agricultural Research at Ahmadu Bello University. She lectured in climatology; plant morphology and pathology; and the botany of East African crop plants. From 1968 she was appointed professor and head of department of crop protection.

Return to England

In 1971, at age 60, Keay retired from Ahmadu Bello University and moved to Wye College becoming dean of women students. The next year she was awarded an OBE. and after retirement in 1976 joined the Department of Applied Biology at Cambridge until its closure in 1989. She died at Cambridge in 1998.

References

External links
Collegiate Girls School, Port Elizabeth website

1911 births
1998 deaths
Academic staff of Ahmadu Bello University
University of Cape Town alumni
Alumni of Newnham College, Cambridge
20th-century South African botanists
South African women botanists
British phytopathologists
Women phytopathologists
Officers of the Order of the British Empire
20th-century South African women scientists
South African emigrants to the United Kingdom
20th-century agronomists
Academics of Wye College